Ilkka Heikkinen (born November 13, 1984 in Rauma, Finland) is a Finnish professional ice hockey defenceman who is currently playing for Växjö Lakers Hockey of the Swedish Hockey League (SHL).

Playing career
Heikkinen developed within his hometown club of Lukko before making his professional SM-liiga debut in the 2003–04 season. After 4 season's in the top league with Lukko Ilkka moved to rival HIFK for two years, scoring a career high 37 points in the 2007–08 season.

On May 20, 2009, Heikkinen agreed to a one-year contract with the New York Rangers of the NHL. After making his North American debut with American Hockey League affiliate, the Hartford Wolf Pack, He appeared in his first career NHL game, a 2-1 Rangers victory over the Buffalo Sabres on December 5, 2009. Heikkinen played in 7 games with the Rangers before returning to the Wolf Pack for the majority of the 2009–10 season.

On May 21, 2010, Ilkka returned to Europe, signing a one-year contract with HC Sibir Novosibirsk of the KHL.

On April 29, 2011, Ilkka signed a one-year contract with the Växjö Lakers Hockey of the Swedish Elitserien (SEL).

Career statistics

References

External links

1984 births
Finnish ice hockey defencemen
Living people
Lukko players
HIFK (ice hockey) players
Hartford Wolf Pack players
HC Lugano players
New York Rangers players
Salavat Yulaev Ufa players
HC Sibir Novosibirsk players
TuTo players
Undrafted National Hockey League players
Växjö Lakers players
People from Rauma, Finland
Sportspeople from Satakunta